Springfield Township is one of seventeen townships in Cedar County, Iowa, USA.  As of the 2000 census, its population was 1,138.

History
Springfield Township was organized in 1841. The first school building in Springfield Township was built in 1848.

Geography
According to the USGS, it contains five cemeteries: Elliott Parr Grave, Fairview, Lowden, Van Horn and Zion Church.

References

External links
 US-Counties.com
 City-Data.com

Townships in Cedar County, Iowa
Townships in Iowa
1841 establishments in Iowa Territory